The Berlin–Copenhagen Cycle Route is a  long-distance cycling route that connects the German and Danish capital cities. Between Rostock and Gedser, cyclists must take a ferry.

The Berlin–Copenhagen Cycle Route is part of the  EuroVelo 7 cycling route, which runs from the top of Norway to the island of Malta in the Mediterranean Sea. It also forms part of the German Cycling Network's D-Route 11, which runs from the Bavarian Alps to the Baltic Sea.

Route

The route is paved for the majority of its length, sometimes running on a road with automobiles, but most of the time its own path, which may or may not run parallel to an auto road.  A very few stretches of the route, for example between Neustrelitz and Waren, are not paved but perfectly acceptable to ride over with an average road or hybrid bicycle.  Under certain weather conditions these unpaved roads might require special attention while riding over.  Distinctive signs mark the route at most junctions but acquiring a route map to keep on the journey or a GPS navigation device loaded with the route (available through the official site) is recommended.

In Denmark, the path is fully signposted as National Route 9, with red N9 on a blue background. The ferry across the Grønsund runs only during the summer, about 15 May to 15 September, and during a short period in October.

Accommodation should be planned in advance by those travelling during high tourist seasons such as summer, as many hotels and hostels will have no vacancies towards the end of the day. Camping is possible but legal camping spots and are few and tend to be far from the route itself.

See also
 EuroVelo 7
 German Cycling Network

References

External links

Riding the cycle route Berlin–Kopenhagen
BicycleRoutes&Tours: Berlin–Copenhagen Cycle Route, with map, GPS download, elevation chart, sights and cyclist-friendly accommodation

Cycling in Denmark
Cycling in Germany
Transport in Berlin
Transport in Copenhagen
Cycleways in Germany
Cycleways in Denmark